USS Susan Ann Howard was a schooner requisitioned from the prize court by the Union Navy during the Union blockade of the American Civil War.

Susan Ann Howard was used by the Union Navy for a number of minor roles: storeship, ammunition ship, and collier. She did not remain in service long.

Service history
Few facts exist concerning Susan Ann Howard, a center-board schooner purchased by the Union Navy from the New York City Prize Court on 19 May 1863. Usually referred to as Susan A. Howard, the ship was listed on 5 June 1864 as one of a group of schooners serving on the sounds of North Carolina, presumably at New Bern, North Carolina, as ordnance and store vessels. On 7 July, she was at New Bern serving as an ordnance boat. On 7 September, she was listed as a hulk and serving as a coal schooner. On 30 August, the schooner was ordered to Washington, D.C.; and Susan Ann Howard was sold at the Washington Navy Yard on 15 September to H. F. Hammil.

See also

 Blockade runners of the American Civil War
 Blockade mail of the Confederacy

References

Ships of the Union Navy
Submarine tenders of the United States Navy
Colliers of the United States Navy
Ammunition ships of the United States Navy
American Civil War auxiliary ships of the United States